Dendrobium albosanguineum (white and blood-red dendrobium) is a species of orchid, native to Thailand and Myanmar.

References

External links
IOSPE orchid photos, Dendrobium albosanguineum Lindley & Paxt. 1852, Photos courtesy of Jay Pfahl
CLAN (Camp Lot A Noise, Sarasota Florida USA) Tropical Compendium Pages, Dendrobium albosanguineum Lindl.
Andy's Orchids (Encinitas California USA), Dendrobium albosanguineum
Swiss Orchid Foundation at Herbarium Jany Renz, Dendrobium albosanguineum 

albosanguineum
Orchids of Myanmar
Orchids of Thailand
Plants described in 1851